Wayne County is a county located in the U.S. state of Iowa. As of the 2020 census, the population was 6,497, making it the sixth-least populous county in Iowa. The county seat is Corydon.

History
Wayne County was formed in 1846 but was still attached to other counties for governmental purposes. It was named after General Anthony Wayne.

Its southern border with Missouri was uncertain until the states got a decision from the US Supreme Court in 1848 which held the 1816 Sullivan line (re-marked in 1850), originally run as the northern boundary of an Osage Indian cession. This line is not a true east–west line so the county does not have an exactly rectangular shape.

There had been settlement in this county as early as 1841 by persons thinking they were in Missouri, but the first settlers intending to be in Iowa came about 1848. Its government was organized and the county seat selected in 1851.

Geography

Major highways
 U.S. Highway 65
 Iowa Highway 2
 Iowa Highway 14

Adjacent counties
Lucas County (north)
Appanoose County (east)
Putnam County, Missouri (southeast)
Mercer County, Missouri (southwest)
Decatur County (west)

Demographics

2020 census
There were 3,025 housing units, of which 2,585 were occupied.

2010 census
There were 3,212 housing units, of which 2,652 were occupied.

2000 census
	
As of the census of 2000, there were 6,730 people, 2,821 households, and 1,918 families residing in the county. The population density was 13 people per square mile (5/km2). There were 3,357 housing units at an average density of 6 per square mile (2/km2). The racial makeup of the county was 98.78% White, 0.06% Black or African American, 0.12% Native American, 0.15% Asian, 0.06% Pacific Islander, 0.19% from other races, and 0.64% from two or more races. 0.71% of the population were Hispanic or Latino of any race.

There were 2,821 households, out of which 27.30% had children under the age of 18 living with them, 58.20% were married couples living together, 6.40% had a female householder with no husband present, and 32.00% were non-families. 29.80% of all households were made up of individuals, and 17.90% had someone living alone who was 65 years of age or older. The average household size was 2.34 and the average family size was 2.89.

In the county, the population was spread out, with 23.90% under the age of 18, 5.90% from 18 to 24, 23.40% from 25 to 44, 23.00% from 45 to 64, and 23.80% who were 65 years of age or older. The median age was 43 years. For every 100 females there were 91.70 males. For every 100 females age 18 and over, there were 90.80 males.

The median income for a household in the county was $29,380, and the median income for a family was $35,534. Males had a median income of $26,018 versus $18,310 for females. The per capita income for the county was $15,613. About 10.80% of families and 14.00% of the population were below the poverty line, including 17.20% of those under age 18 and 14.20% of those age 65 or over.

Communities

Cities

Allerton
Clio
Corydon
Humeston
Lineville
Millerton
Promise City
Seymour

Unincorporated communities
Cambria
Confidence
Harvard
New York
Sewal

Ghost town
Big Spring

Townships

 Benton
 Clay
 Clinton
 Corydon
 Grand River
 Howard
 Jackson
 Jefferson
 Monroe
 Richman
 South Fork
 Union
 Walnut
 Warren
 Washington
 Wright

Population ranking
The population ranking of the following table is based on the 2020 census of Wayne County.

† county seat

Politics

See also

National Register of Historic Places listings in Wayne County, Iowa

References

External links

County website

 
1846 establishments in Iowa Territory
Populated places established in 1846